Start Again EP is an extended play by Japanese singer Crystal Kay, released on February 24, 2023, by Virgin Music. All of the songs from the EP are featured on the Amazon Prime Video original drama, A2Z.

Background 
In 2022, Crystal Kay returned to performing in a Japanese version of Pippin, which gave her a nomination for Best Actress at the 2020 Yomiuri Theater Awards. She released three singles in 2022, "Gimme Some" featuring Japanese rapper Daichi Yamamoto, "No Pressure" featuring Japanese singer VivaOla and "Love Me". In January 2023, Kay revealed she would be providing songs for A2Z, an Amazon Prime Video original Japanese drama show. The A2Z soundtrack additionally was announced, with four songs provided by Kay. On February 1, Kay announced she would be releasing a digital EP, titled Start Again EP. Kay revealed the EP would include a cover song of "One Flight Down". In an interview with Music Natalie, Kay stated she co-wrote songs with Emi Meyer, a Japanese jazz singer-songwriter. Kay additionally revealed all the songs on the EP would be recorded in English, rather than in Japanese.

Track listing 
All tracks produced by Emi Meyer.

Personnel 
Credits adapted from Tidal.

Musicians 

Emi Meyer – production, songwriting (1–3)
Yumi Shimazu – cello (1, 2)
Crystal Kay Williams – vocals (all tracks), songwriting (2, 3)
Masaki Hayashi – piano (all tracks)
Kintaro Hagiya – viola (1, 2)
Daehyok Jang – violin (1, 2)
Erika Aoyama – violin (1, 2)
Tetsuo Sakurai – bass (2–4)
Sakata Manabu – drums (2–4)
Tanaka Kunikazu  – bass flute (2)
Ishii Masayuki – guitar (3)
Jesse Harris – songwriting (4)

Technical 

 Emi Meyer – recording arrangement (all tracks)
 Yoshiaki Onishi – mixing, engineering (all tracks)
 Daisuke Kawaguchi – string arrangement (1, 2)

Release history

References 

2023 EPs
Crystal Kay EPs
Virgin Records EPs
Universal Music Japan EPs